Stachybotrys is a genus of molds, hyphomycetes or asexually reproducing, filamentous fungi, now placed in the family Stachybotryaceae. The genus was erected by August Carl Joseph Corda in 1837. Historically, it was considered closely related to the genus Memnoniella, because the spores are produced in slimy heads rather than in dry chains. Recently, the synonymy of the two genera is generally accepted. Most Stachybotrys species inhabit materials rich in cellulose. The genus has a widespread distribution and contains about 50 species. The name comes from the Greek words σταχυς stakhus (ear of grain, stalk, stick; metaphorically, progeny) and βότρυς botrus (cluster or bunch as in grapes, trusses).

The most infamous species, S. chartarum (previously known as S. atra) and S. chlorohalonata, are known as black mold or toxic black mold in the U.S., and are frequently associated with poor indoor air quality that arises after fungal growth on water-damaged building materials. Stachybotrys chemotypes are toxic, with one producing trichothecene mycotoxins including satratoxins, and another that produces atranones. However, the association of Stachybotrys mold with specific health conditions is not well proven and there exists a debate within the scientific community.

Conidia 
Conidia are in slimy masses, smooth to coarsely rough, dark olivaceous to brownish black, obovoid, later becoming ellipsoid with age, 10–13 × 5–7 mm. Phialides are obovate or ellipsoidal, colorless early then turning to olivaceous with maturity, smooth, 12–14 × 5–7 mm, in clusters of 5 to 9 phialides. Conidiophores are simple, erect, smooth to rough, colorless to olivaceous, slightly enlarged apically, mostly unbranched but occasionally branched. Conidia of Stachybotrys are very characteristic and can be confidently identified in spore count samples. This genus is closely related to Memnoniella. Species of Memnoniella may occasionally develop Stachybotrys-like conidia, and vice versa.

Detection 
Four distinctive microbial volatile organic compounds (MVOCs) – 1-butanol, 3-methyl-1-butanol, 3-methyl-2-butanol, and thujopsene – were detected on rice cultures, and only one (1-butanol) was detected on gypsum board cultures.

Pathogenicity

Symptoms of Stachybotrys exposure in humans
A controversy began in the early 1990s after analysis of two infant deaths and multiple cases in children from the poor areas of Cleveland, Ohio, United States, due to pulmonary hemorrhage were initially linked to exposure to heavy amounts of Stachybotrys chartarum. Subsequent and extensive reanalysis of the cases by the United States Centers for Disease Control and Prevention have failed to find any link between the deaths and the mold exposure.

Species

Stachybotrys albipes (Berk. & Broome) S.C. Jong & Davis (1976)
Stachybotrys alternans Bonord. (1851)
Stachybotrys breviuscula McKenzie (1991)
Stachybotrys chartarum (Ehrenb.) S. Hughes (1958)
Stachybotrys chlorohalonata  B. Andersen & Thrane (2003)
Stachybotrys cylindrospora C.N. Jensen (1912)
Stachybotrys dichroa Grove (1886)
Stachybotrys elegans (Pidopl.) W. Gams (1980)
Stachybotrys eucylindrospora D.W. Li (2007)
Stachybotrys freycinetiae McKenzie (1991)
Stachybotrys kampalensis Hansf. (1943)
Stachybotrys kapiti Whitton, McKenzie & K.D. Hyde (2001)
Stachybotrys longispora Matsush. (1975)
Stachybotrys mangiferae P.C. Misra & S.K. Srivast. (1982)
Stachybotrys microspora (B.L. Mathur & Sankhla) S.C. Jong & E.E. Davis (1976)
Stachybotrys nephrodes McKenzie (1991)
Stachybotrys nephrospora Hansf. (1943)
Stachybotrys nilagirica Subram. (1957)
Stachybotrys oenanthes M.B. Ellis (1971)
Stachybotrys parvispora S. Hughes (1952)
Stachybotrys ruwenzoriensis Matsush. (1985)
Stachybotrys sansevieriae G.P. Agarwal & N.D. Sharma (1974)
Stachybotrys sinuatophora Matsush. (1971)
Stachybotrys suthepensis Photita, P. Lumyong, K.D. Hyde & McKenzie (2003)
Stachybotrys theobromae Hansf. (1943)
Stachybotrys waitakere Whitton, McKenzie & K.D. Hyde (2001)

See also 

Bioaerosol
Mold growth, assessment, and remediation
Mold health issues
Sick building syndrome

References

Further reading

External links

Hypocreales genera
Environmental toxicology
Stachybotryaceae
Taxa named by August Carl Joseph Corda
Taxa described in 1837